Admiral James Oren Ellis Jr. (born July 20, 1947) is a retired 4-star admiral and former Commander, United States Strategic Command, Offutt Air Force Base, Nebraska. He was President and Chief Executive Officer, Institute of Nuclear Power Operations until May 2012 and serves on the board of directors of Lockheed Martin.

Since retiring from the military, Ellis has been the Annenberg Distinguished Visiting Fellow at the Hoover Institution at Stanford University.

In 2013, Ellis was elected a member of the National Academy of Engineering for leadership in advancing safe nuclear power plant operations throughout the world.

Early life
Ellis, born in Spartanburg, South Carolina, is a 1969 graduate of the United States Naval Academy. He was designated a Naval Aviator in 1971 and held a variety of sea and shore assignments from 1972.

Naval career

Ellis' sea duty billets as a navy fighter pilot included tours with Fighter Squadron 92 aboard  and Fighter Squadron 1 aboard . Ellis was the first Commanding Officer of Strike/Fighter Squadron 131, deploying in 1985 with new F/A-18 Hornets aboard . In June 1995, Ellis assumed command of Carrier Group Five/Battle Force Seventh Fleet, breaking his flag aboard , forward deployed to the Western Pacific and homeported in Yokosuka, Japan. As Carrier Battle Group Commander he led contingency response operations to both the Persian Gulf and Taiwan Straits.

Ellis' shore and staff assignments include tours as an experimental/operational test pilot, service in the Navy Office of Legislative Affairs, and duty as F/A-18 Program Coordinator, Deputy Chief of Naval Operations (Air Warfare). He has also served as Deputy Commander and Chief of Staff, Joint Task Force FIVE, the counter-narcotics force for United States Commander in Chief Pacific. In November 1993 he reported as Inspector General, United States Atlantic Fleet, and subsequently served as Director for Operations, Plans and Policy (N3/N5) on the staff of the Commander in Chief, United States Atlantic Fleet. He assumed duties as Deputy Chief of Naval Operations (Plans, Policy and Operations) in November 1996. Ellis became Commander in Chief, United States Naval Forces Europe, headquartered in London, England, and Commander in Chief, Allied Forces, Southern Europe headquartered in Naples, Italy, in October 1998.

Ellis served as Commander, United States Strategic Command from 2002 and retired from the navy in 2004.

Education
Ellis holds Master of Science degrees in Aerospace Engineering from the Georgia Institute of Technology and in Aeronautical Systems from the University of West Florida. He is also a 1975 graduate of United States Naval Test Pilot School. He completed United States Navy nuclear power training in 1987 and is a graduate of the Senior Officer Program in National Security Strategy at Harvard University.

Awards and decorations

References

External links

 Level 3 appoints James O. Ellis, Jr., as the Chairman Of The Board
 
 Lockheed Martin Board

1947 births
Living people
People from Spartanburg, South Carolina
United States Naval Academy alumni
United States Naval Aviators
United States Navy personnel of the Vietnam War
Georgia Tech alumni
United States Naval Test Pilot School alumni
University of West Florida alumni
United States Navy personnel of the Gulf War
Harvard University alumni
United States Navy admirals
Recipients of the Legion of Merit
Recipients of the Navy Distinguished Service Medal
Recipients of the Defense Distinguished Service Medal